Börde is a district in Saxony-Anhalt in Germany. Its seat is the town Haldensleben. It takes its name from the natural region Magdeburg Börde. It is the site of the Morsleben radioactive waste repository. The disposal of waste into the facility ended in 1998.

Geography
The Börde district covers the area west of the city of Magdeburg. It is bounded by (from the north and clockwise) the districts Altmarkkreis Salzwedel, Stendal, Jerichower Land, the city of Magdeburg, Salzlandkreis and Harz. To the west it borders the state of Lower Saxony. The main rivers are the Elbe in the northeast, the Ohre in the north, the Aller in the west and the Bode in the south.

History 

The district was formed with the merger the former districts of Ohrekreis and Bördekreis as part of the local-government reform of 2007.

Oschersleben, a former Verwaltungsgemeinschaft disbanded in 2010.

Towns and municipalities 

The district Börde consists of the following subdivisions:

Other localities
Glindenberg, village and former municipality

References